WFOG-LP is a Variety-formatted broadcast radio station licensed to and serving Hillsville, Virginia. WFOG-LP is owned and operated by Pink Doors Media.

References

External links
 

2015 establishments in Virginia
Variety radio stations in the United States
Radio stations established in 2015
FOG-LP
FOG-LP